Christmas Present is the twenty-seventh studio album and the second Christmas album by American country music group The Statler Brothers. Released in 1985 via Mercury Records, it peaked at number 42 on the Billboard Top Country Albums chart.

Track listing
"Christmas Eve (Kodia's Theme)" (Don Reid, Harold Reid) – 3:16
"Christmas Country Style" (Jimmy Fortune) – 2:00
"Brahms' Bethlehem Lullaby" (Philip Balsley, Lew DeWitt, H. Reid) – 2:45
"Somewhere in the Night" (D. Reid) – 2:32
"An Old Fashioned Christmas" (John Rimel) – 3:27
"No Reservation at the Inn" (D. Reid, H. Reid) – 2:50
"Mary's Sweet Smile" (Balsley, Fortune, D. Reid, H. Reid) – 2:47
"Whose Birthday Is Christmas?" (H. Reid) – 2:40
"Old Toy Trains" (Roger Miller) – 2:32
"For Momma" (D. Reid, H. Reid) – 3:30

Chart performance

References

1985 Christmas albums
The Statler Brothers albums
Mercury Records albums
Albums produced by Jerry Kennedy
Christmas albums by American artists
Country Christmas albums